is a gerontocratic form of government in some parts of Igboland, Nigeria. It is also a common term or name normally taken as a surname or title by a person or persons whose father is the eldest in a village, or one who is the eldest in the town of Nsukka or its villages. Nkalagu in Ebonyi state, Nigeria also reserves such a title for the eldest man per village.

 simply means the oldest, head, or leader—be it man or woman. In normal Nsukka settings, once a man or woman becomes the oldest in his or her village, he or she is given the title .
For one to be  in a village, the person must be the eldest in that village. An example of the title's usage as a surname is Chief Samuel Maduka Onyishi.

She summons all the women from the village for meetings if needed and speaks on their behalf. No  is given to her because they are only permitted to be given to men.

The  is carried in bulk by the village head daily to his ancestral home, commonly called  (palace) in the mornings. The practice continues like this until the present  dies.

This practice has been in existence for centuries. In Nsukka, or Nru Nsukka precisely, there are  that are over hundreds of years old yet unrecorded due to the late arrival of the needed technologies in Nsukka. The family name  is thus very common among the Nsukka people.

The  in recent years has been disputed by some Christians who claim it is a form of idolatry and instead give their colleagues a crucifix on attaining such age.

According to Atugwu Kenechukwu from Nru Nsukka, every  in Nsukka has a style of dress which normally includes a red cap with a red feather (called ) from a special bird fixed on it, a short stick from a known tree called oho, and a hand bag.

The oho also stands as a symbol of office and justice, and it is held by all  and the  whenever the person speaks on matters concerning the people. It is expected that whoever holds the  should always speak the truth as it is a symbol of justice. Each new  receives his own  before his coronation day.

Demise of an 
If a reigning  dies, the man taking over from the deceased must visit the funeral home of the deceased  and perform rituals before the burial proceeds.  This practice is limited to incoming male ; a woman does not necessarily need the ritual process.

The rituals are done in various ways now due to the arrival of Christianity.  In the most common ritual, the incoming  prays before the corpse and in the presence of the corpse and mourners.  He brings kola nuts and a cock, which he must slaughter, declaring that if he had a hand in killing the  whose place he is taking over, he should die within a month.

At the end of the month, the new  is then crowned by other  in his area (Nsukka) and other title holders called .

References

External links
  the eldest man in Amaogbo village is called Onyishi same with other village in Nsukka.
 The eldest man (Onyishi) in the Nguru villages as you can see here remains the legal signatories with regards to the community village affairs where he leads is concerned.

Nigeria
Igbo culture